King Swamp is the self-titled debut album of the British rock band King Swamp.  Originally released in May 1989, the album was well received by critics.  But, its failure to peak even in the top-150 on the Billboard 200 proved to be a bad omen.  When their second album failed to chart anywhere in the U.S. or the U.K., the band split up.  Despite the failure of the album to find a commercial audience, it did have the distinction of being featured on the 1980s TV show Miami Vice.  The track 'Year Zero' was used during the pre-credit car chase sequence of the two-hour finale episode titled "Freefall" (first aired on 21 May 1989).

Track listing
 "Is This Love?" – 4:00
 "Blown Away" – 4:11
 "Man Behind the Gun" – 4:27
 "Original Man" – 3:24
 "Widders Dump" – 4:53
 "Year Zero" – 3:54
 "Mirror" – 4:57
 "Motherlode" – 4:26
 "Louisiana Bride" – 4:34
 "The Sacrament" – 5:15
 "Glow" – 5:42 (Bonus Track on UK CD)

Chart performance

Personnel
King Swamp
Walter Wray - lead vocals
Steve Halliwell - additional vocals, keyboards
Dominic Miller - guitar, dobro
Dave Allen - bass guitar
Martyn Barker - drums
Technical
Bob Clearmountain - mixing

References

1989 debut albums
King Swamp albums
Virgin Records albums